At This Time is an album by American pianist, composer and music producer Burt Bacharach, released in 2005 through Columbia Records. Guests include Elvis Costello and Rufus Wainwright. In 2006, it won a Grammy Award for Best Pop Instrumental Album.

Reception

Track listing
 "Please Explain" (Bacharach, Porter, Tonio K.) – 4:22
 "Where Did It Go?" (Bacharach, Board, Tonio K.) – 4:21
 "In Our Time" (Bacharach) – 4:09
 "Who Are These People?" (Bacharach, Tonio K.) – 4:17
 "Is Love Enough?" (Bacharach, Tonio K.) – 6:08
 "Can't Give It Up" (Bacharach, Tonio K.) – 4:39
 "Go Ask Shakespeare" (Bacharach, Tonio K.) – 5:45
 "Dreams" (Bacharach, Chris Botti, Tonio) – 4:13
 "Danger" (Bacharach) – 4:31
 "Fade Away" (Bacharach) – 3:52
 "Always Taking Aim" (Bacharach, Tonio K.) – 6:54

Personnel

 Burt Bacharach – synthesizer, piano, arranger, composer, flugelhorn, keyboards, vocals, producer, Fender Rhodes, oberheim, audio production
Dr.Dre – drum and bass loop
 Karen Elaine Bakunin – principal
 Charlie Bisharat – violin, concertmaster
 Printz Board – composer, drum loop
 Chris Botti – composer
 Denyse Buffum – principal
 Greg Burns – engineer
 Jeff Burns – engineer
 Mark Cargill – concertmaster
 Daniel Chase – percussion, digital editing
 Susan Chatman – concertmaster
 Billy Childs Trio – Wurlitzer
 Terry Christiansen – double bass
 Vinnie Colaiuta – drums
 Elvis Costello – vocals
 Jim Cox – piano, keyboards
 Paulinho da Costa – percussion
 John Daversa – trumpet, flugelhorn
 Mario Diaz de Leon – concertmaster
 Joel Derouin – violin, concertmaster
 Andrew Duckles – principal
 Earl Dumler – oboe
 John Eidsvoog – music preparation
 Mike Elizondo – bass programming
 Jerry Epstein – principal
 Michael Fisher – percussion
 Ron Folsom – concertmaster
 Armen Garabedian – concertmaster
 Berj Garabedian – concertmaster
 Grant Geissman – guitar
 Terry Glenny – concertmaster
 Gary Grant – trumpet, flugelhorn
 Dan Greco – percussion
 Andrew Hale – executive producer
 Olaf Heine – cover photo
 Dan Higgins – clarinet, saxophone, sax (alto)
 Josie James – vocals
 Suzie Katayama – music Preparation, principal
 Peter Kent – concertmaster
 Dmitri Kourka – principal
 Gina Kronstadt – concertmaster
 Warren Luening – trumpet, flugelhorn
 Sue Main – assistant
 Miguel Martinez – principal
 Darrin McCann – principal
 Dave O'Donnell – engineer
 John Pagano – vocals
 Don Palmer – concertmaster
 Cameron Patrick – concertmaster
 Mike Pela – engineer
 Ted Perlman – synthesizer, bass, programming, synthesizer programming
 Barbara Porter – concertmaster
 Denaun Porter – composer, loops, drum loop, bass programming
 Michele Richards – concertmaster
 John Robinson – drums
 Jimbo Ross – principal
 Rob Shrock – synthesizer
 Allen Sides – engineer, mixing, audio engineer
 Dan Tobin Smith – principal
 Sally Stevens – vocals
 Robert Stringer – executive producer
 Neil Stubenhaus – bass (electric)
 Donna Taylor – vocals
 JoAnn Tominaga – production coordination, strings contractor
 Tonio K. – composer
 Mari Tsumura – concertmaster
 Rufus Wainwright – vocals
 Evan Wilson – viola
 Margaret Wooten – concertmaster
 Alan Yoshida – mixing
 Shari Zippert – concertmaster

References

2005 albums
Columbia Records albums
Burt Bacharach albums
Albums produced by Burt Bacharach
Grammy Award for Best Contemporary Instrumental Album